Aston Heath is an area in Derbyshire, England. It is located 1 mile east of Sudbury, close to the A50 road.  It takes its name from Aston, 1 mile southwest. Population details taken at the 2011 Census are included in the civil parish of Sudbury, Derbyshire.

References

External links

Villages in Derbyshire
Derbyshire Dales